Marco Piredda (born 4 May 1994) is an Italian football player. He plays for Carbonia.

Club career
He made his Serie C debut for Como on 22 September 2013 in a game against Südtirol.

On 19 February 2019, he was released from his contract with Olbia by mutual consent.

On 30 July 2019 he signed a one-year contract with Sambenedettese.

References

External links
 

1994 births
Sportspeople from Cagliari
Footballers from Sardinia
Living people
Italian footballers
Cagliari Calcio players
Como 1907 players
Ternana Calcio players
A.C.N. Siena 1904 players
Olbia Calcio 1905 players
A.S. Sambenedettese players
Serie B players
Serie C players
Serie D players
Association football midfielders